Acraea cepheus, the Cepheus acraea, is a butterfly of the family Nymphalidae. It is found in Africa, from Nigeria and Angola to Uganda, western Tanzania and Zambia.

Description

A. cepheus L. (54 f) differs from all the African Acraeids known to me in the hindwing having a submarginal dot in cellule 7, so that there are 3 black dots in this cellule ; the forewing has a black transverse streak at the middle and one at the apex of the cell and large discal dots, of which the one in 1 b is nearer to the distal margin than that in 2 and those in cellules 3 to 6 form a transverse band, at least in the male the submarginal dots are often united with the black marginal band. The marginal band of the hindwing is 2 mm. in breadth, proximally dentate on the veins, above unicolorous, beneath spotted with light yellow, and the discal dots are approximated to the base; beneath the ground-colour is light yellowish to whitish, with large red or orange-yellow spots between the black dots and at the marginal band. In the type-form, described by Linne and figured by Clerck from the type in his rare work Icones insectorum, the forewing has in 3 to 6 beyond the discal dots a light subapical band, which in the male is red-yellow, in the female white; in the basal part of the forewing is red-yellow as far as the submarginal dots in lb and 2 and the discal dots in 3 to 6, and the hindwing above red-yellow, black-scaled at the base; in the female both wings above are black-grey with smaller dots than in the male; the hindwing often somewhat tinged with yellowish. Gold Coast to Angola and the Soudan. -abdera Hew. [ now species Acraea abdera ](54 f male) differs in the absence of the light subapical band of the forewing and in having both wings above more broadly black at the base. Nigeria to the Congo.- In eginopsis Auriv.[now subspecies of Acraea abdera] the forewing of the male has a blackish ground-colour above and has only in the distal half of cellules 1 a and 1 b a large red-yellow spot; the hindwing coloured as in the type-form. Sierra Leone to Togoland. - female ab. pheusaca Suff. Forewing above yellow-brown as far as the ochre-yellow subapical band, with the black dots small or absent; hindwing above brown-yellow with small discal dots; occurs together with abdera. female-ab. sucepha Suff. Wings above with red-yellow ground-colour as in the male and the forewing with white subapical band. Marginal band of the hindwing above with yellow marginal spots. Among the type-form. -  female ab. nigrescens Eltr. [now forma of abdera ] (54 f; as abdera female). Both wings above black-brown with distinct black dots; the hindwing above somewhat lighter before the marginal band; the latter with marginal spots; is probably the female of eginopsis. Sierra Leone.

Biology
The habitat consists of forests.

The larvae feed on Caloncoba welwitschii and Lindackeria dentata.

Taxonomy
It is a member of the Acraea cepheus species group.

References

External links

Images representing Acraea cepheus at Bold

cepheus
Butterflies of Africa
Butterflies described in 1758
Taxa named by Carl Linnaeus